Loren Parks (born 1926) is a businessman from the U.S. state of Nevada. He previously lived in Oregon (from 1957–2002), and is the biggest political contributor in the history of that state. He has financed numerous ballot measure initiative petitions and campaigns since the mid-1990s. He has also contributed heavily to races for prominent offices by his attorney, Kevin Mannix, a frequent chief petitioner of ballot campaigns.

Early life
Parks was born in Wichita, Kansas in 1926. He served in the military from 1944–1946. He has a BA in psychology, having studied at five different universities. He speaks several languages.

Parks later started a business while living in Aloha, Oregon. He founded Parks Medical Electronics in 1961. The business sells a number of instruments, including a plethysmograph, which measures the blood flow to sexual organs and is used in treating sexual dysfunction and assessing the arousal of sex offenders.

Philanthropic Work
Loren donates to many local, national and worldwide charities now and throughout his lifetime. His generous donations help numerous people.

Influential in Oregon politics
From 1996 to 2006, Parks contributed over $6 million to various political campaigns – far more than any other individual, and more than most organized lobbies. His entry into backing political concerns followed the passage of Ballot Measure 5 in 1990. His support was instrumental in launching Oregon Taxpayers United, according to executive director Bill Sizemore.

Parks' dominance of the ballot measure system has been said to undermine the grassroots intent of the system.

In 2001, a former employee filed a sexual harassment complaint and lawsuit against Parks.

Parks moved from Oregon to Henderson, Nevada in 2002.

Parks made contributions to uphold the Oregon Death with Dignity Act in 1997.

Parks has been a strong supporter of former state legislator and gubernatorial candidate Kevin Mannix. Mannix has served as Parks' attorney. Parks' staff once said: "Mr. Parks thinks Kevin is one of the few leaders who keeps his word and gets things done."

Parks has not indiscriminately backed Mannix's proposed measures. In 2008, for instance, he declined to fund a proposed initiative that would have allowed for expanded local regulation of strip clubs. As a result, Mannix stopped pursuing ballot qualification.

In 2008, Parks was the source of over half the money used to qualify ballot measures for the statewide ballot. None of the measures he supported in that year was successful.

Parks is also a major contributor to charitable organizations, including health care and environmental concerns.

Parks is not religious, but is a believer in faith healing.

In March 2014, Parks gave a $30,000 donation to Greg Barreto (R) of Cove, OR towards his campaign for Oregon State Assembly. That donation was returned in April.

See also
 List of Oregon ballot measures
 Oregon Ballot Measure 11 (1994)

References

External links
 Psychological Research Foundation Inc.

1926 births
Living people
People from Henderson, Nevada
People from Aloha, Oregon
People from Wichita, Kansas
Oregon politicians
Businesspeople from Nevada